Alexander Nikolayevich Zhitinsky (January 19, 1941January 25, 2012) was a Russian writer and journalist. He used the pseudonyms Rock-diletant, МАССА, and Maccolit.

He was born into the family of a military pilot on January 19, 1941. After finishing his education at the Leningrad Polytechnic Institute, he became a well-known author, publishing 12 books during his career. He died on January 25, 2012.

References

External links
Zhitinsky's website 

1941 births
2012 deaths
People from Simferopol
Soviet journalists
Russian journalists
Soviet male poets
Soviet poets
20th-century Russian male writers
Russian male poets
Soviet dramatists and playwrights
Russian dramatists and playwrights
Russian publishers (people)
20th-century pseudonymous writers